Elisabet Escursell Valero (born 30 October 1996) is a Spanish professional racing cyclist, who currently rides for UCI Women's Continental Team .

See also
 List of 2015 UCI Women's Teams and riders

References

External links
 

1996 births
Living people
Spanish female cyclists
Sportspeople from Terrassa
Cyclists at the 2014 Summer Youth Olympics
Cyclists from Catalonia
21st-century Spanish women